Bill Scheft (born February 15, 1957 in Boston, Massachusetts) is an American comedy writer and novelist. He is best known for being a staff writer for David Letterman from 1991–2015, during which time he was nominated for 15 Emmy awards. He ran a weekly humor column "The Show" in Sports Illustrated from 2002 to 2005. A collection of his columns, The Best of "The Show", was published by Warner Books in 2005.

Scheft is the author of four novels: The Ringer (2002), Time Won't Let Me (2005), Everything Hurts (2009) and Shrink Thyself (2014). Time Won't Let Me was a finalist for the 2006 Thurber Prize for American Humor. Both The Ringer and Everything Hurts have been optioned for film.

Scheft is the nephew of the late Herbert Warren Wind, the legendary golf and profile writer for The New Yorker and Sports Illustrated. In 2011, he co-edited and wrote a foreword for the collection, America's Gift to Golf: Herbert Warren Wind on The Masters. 
Scheft graduated from Harvard College in 1979 with honors. He was married to comedian Adrianne Tolsch for 26 years before her death on December 7, 2016.

References

External links

1957 births
21st-century American novelists
American comedy writers
20th-century American Jews
American male novelists
Harvard University alumni
Living people
Writers from Boston
21st-century American male writers
Novelists from Massachusetts
21st-century American Jews